The Mutual of America Financial Group, also referred to as Mutual of America, is a Fortune 1000 mutual company based in Manhattan, New York City.  Founded in 1945, it is ranked on the Forbes 500 list as the tenth-largest retirement provider in the United States.

History 
Mutual of America Financial Group was founded in 1945. It specialized in retirement products for nonprofit organizations.

In 1976, Mutual of America moved its headquarters into  at 666 Fifth Avenue. In 1992, Mutual of America bought a 34-story building at 320 Park Avenue in New York from Olympia and York for $130 million, and turned it into the Mutual of America building. The building had been occupied by ITT Inc. up until 1990. The building's redesign was managed by Swanke Hayden Connell Architects.

In 1971, William Flynn became the president of Mutual of America. He became the CEO the following year, and the chairman in 1982.

In 2005, he became the company chairman emeritus of Mutual of America.

In 1994, Thomas J. Moran was named president and CEO of the company, the first person to have been appointed president from within the company. In June 2005, he was appointed chairman of the board.

Thanks to a safe asset management policy, the company remained profitable throughout the subprime mortgage crisis.

In 2016, Thomas J. Moran retired from the role of CEO of the group after a 21-year office. The President John R. Greed replaced him, becoming president and CEO. In 2018, John Greed became chairman of the board following Thomas Moran's decision to retire.

In December 2018, the company held a premiere screening of the documentary film In Money We Trust?. In 2019, Mutual of America raised its stakes in Microsoft to reach a stock holding value of $159.953 million. Microsoft is the group' s second largest asset.

Description 
Mutual of America Financial Group specializes in providing pension and retirement-related products, programs, and services. The company provides products and services for employee benefit plans of for-profit and nonprofit organizations, their employees, life insurance, retirement products to individuals, and mutual funds to institutional investors.

The company has 35 regional field offices located across the United States.

Governance

Board of directors 

 Chairman of the Board: John R. Greed
Clifford L. Alexander Jr. (former Secretary of the Army)
Rosemary T. Berkery (former Chairman and CEO UBS Bank USA)
Kimberly Casiano
Wayne A.I. Frederick (President Howard University Washington)
Earle H. Harbison Jr
Frances Hesselbein (Founder and CEO Haver Analytics)
Amir Lear
Connie Mack III (former senator)
Robert J. McGuire (former NYC Police Commissioner)
Ellen Ochoa (astronaut)
Roger B. Porter (IBM Professor of Business and Government at Harvard University)
Dennis Reimer (33rd Chief of Staff of the Army)
James J. Roth

References

External links

Official website

Financial services companies established in 1945
1945 establishments in New York (state)
Mutual insurance companies
Life insurance companies of the United States
Companies based in New York City
Mutual insurance companies of the United States
Insurance companies based in New York City
American companies established in 1945